Burramine South is a locality in the Shire of Moira. Burramine South post office opened on 1 February 1882, closed on 17 December 1910, reopened on the 19 September 1911 and closed on 1 August 1952. Burramine South Creamery post office opened on the 1 July 1905 and was closed on 1 January 1918.

References

Towns in Victoria (Australia)
Shire of Moira